The SH2 (Src Homology 2) domain is a structurally conserved protein domain contained within the Src oncoprotein and in many other intracellular signal-transducing proteins. SH2 domains allow proteins containing those domains to dock to phosphorylated tyrosine residues on other proteins. SH2 domains are commonly found in adaptor proteins that aid in the signal transduction of receptor tyrosine kinase pathways.

Background
SH2 is conserved by signalization of protein tyrosine kinase, which are binding on phosphotyrosine (pTyr). In the human proteome the class of pTyr-selective recognition domains is represented by SH2 domains. The N-terminal SH2 domains of cytoplasmic tyrosine kinase was at the beginning of evolution evolved with the occurrence of tyrosine phosphorylation. At the beginning it was supposed that, these domains serve as a substrate for their target kinase.

Protein-protein interactions play a major role in cellular growth and development. Modular domains, which are the subunits of a protein, moderate these protein interactions by identifying short peptide sequences. These peptide sequences determine the binding partners of each protein. One of the more prominent domains is the SH2 domain. 
SH2 domains play a vital role in cellular communication. Its length is approximately 100 amino acids long and it is found within 111 human proteins. Regarding its structure, it contains 2 alpha helices and 7 beta strands. Research has shown that it has a high affinity to phosphorylated tyrosine residues and it is known to identify a sequence of 3–6 amino acids within a peptide motif.

Binding and phosphorylation
SH2 domains typically bind a phosphorylated tyrosine residue in the context of a longer peptide motif within a target protein, and SH2 domains represent the largest class of known pTyr-recognition domains.

Phosphorylation of tyrosine residues in a protein occurs during signal transduction and is carried out by tyrosine kinases. In this way, phosphorylation of a substrate by tyrosine kinases acts as a switch to trigger binding to an SH2 domain-containing protein. Many tyrosine containing short linear motifs that bind to SH2 domains are conserved across a wide variety of higher Eukaryotes. The intimate relationship between tyrosine kinases and SH2 domains is supported by their coordinate emergence during eukaryotic evolution.

Diversity
SH2 domains are not present in yeast and appear at the boundary between protozoa and animalia in organisms such as the social amoeba Dictyostelium discoideum.

A detailed bioinformatic examination of SH2 domains of human and mouse reveals 120 SH2 domains contained within 115 proteins encoded by the human genome, representing a rapid rate of evolutionary expansion among the SH2 domains.

A large number of SH2 domain structures have been solved and many SH2 proteins have been knocked out in mice.

Function 
The function of SH2 domains is to specifically recognize the phosphorylated state of tyrosine residues, thereby allowing SH2 domain-containing proteins to localize to tyrosine-phosphorylated sites. This process constitutes the fundamental event of signal transduction through a membrane, in which a signal in the extracellular compartment is "sensed" by a receptor and is converted in the intracellular compartment to a different chemical form, i.e. that of a phosphorylated tyrosine. Tyrosine phosphorylation leads to activation of a cascade of protein-protein interactions whereby SH2 domain-containing proteins are recruited to tyrosine-phosphorylated sites. This process initiates a series of events which eventually result in altered patterns of gene expression or other cellular responses.
The SH2 domain, which was first identified in the oncoproteins Src and Fps, is about 100 amino-acid residues long. It functions as a regulatory module of intracellular signaling cascades by interacting with high affinity to phosphotyrosine-containing target peptides in a sequence-specific and strictly phosphorylation-dependent manner.

Applications 
SH2 domains, and other binding domains, have been used in protein engineering to create protein assemblies. Protein assemblies are formed when several proteins bind to one another to create a larger structure (called a supramolecular assembly). Using molecular biology techniques, fusion proteins of specific enzymes and SH2 domains have been created, which can bind to each other to form protein assemblies. 

Since SH2 domains require phosphorylation in order for binding to occur, the use of kinase and phosphatase enzymes gives researchers control over whether protein assemblies will form or not. High affinity engineered SH2 domains have been developed and utilized for protein assembly applications.

The goal of most protein assembly formation is to increase the efficiency of metabolic pathways via enzymatic co-localization.  Other applications of SH2 domain mediated protein assemblies have been in the formation of high density fractal-like structures, which have extensive molecular trapping properties.

Examples 
Human proteins containing this domain include:
 ABL1; ABL2
 BCAR3; BLK; BLNK; BMX; BTK
 CHN2; CISH; CRK; CRKL; CSK
 DAPP1
 FER; FES; FGR; FRK; FYN
 GRAP; GRAP2; GRB10; GRB14; GRB2; GRB7
 HCK; HSH2D
 INPP5D; INPPL1; ITK;  JAK2; LCK; LCP2; LYN
 MATK; NCK1; NCK2
 PIK3R1; PIK3R2; PIK3R3; PLCG1; PLCG2; PTK6; PTPN11; PTPN6; RASA1
 SH2B1; SH2B2; SH2B3; SH2D1A; SH2D1B; SH2D2A; SH2D3A; SH2D3C; SH2D4A; SH2D4B; SH2D5; SH2D6; SH3BP2; SHB; SHC1; SHC3; SHC4; SHD; SHE
 SLA; SLA2
 SOCS1; SOCS2; SOCS3; SOCS4; SOCS5; SOCS6; SOCS7
 SRC; SRMS
 STAT1; STAT2; STAT3; STAT4; STAT5A; STAT5B; STAT6
 SUPT6H; SYK
 TEC; TENC1; TNS; TNS1; TNS3; TNS4; TXK
 VAV1; VAV2; VAV3
 YES1;  ZAP70

See also 
Phosphotyrosine-binding domains also bind phosphorylated tyrosines
Anthony Pawson, discoverer of the SH2 Domain

References

External links 

SH2 Domain website created by lab of Dr. Piers Nash

Protein domains
Signal transduction
Peripheral membrane proteins